The javelin throw is an Olympic track and field event. Athletes specialising in the discipline are known as javelin throwers.

Notable javelin throwers

Men
Steve Backley, Great Britain
Edgar Baumann, Paraguay
Patrik Bodén, Sweden
Terry Bradshaw, United States
Al Cantello, United States
Marius Corbett, South Africa
Egil Danielsen, Norway
Konstadinós Gatsioúdis, Greece
Breaux Greer, United States
Flint Hanner, United States
Arto Härkönen, Finland
Bud Held, United States
Uwe Hohn, GDR
Toivo Hyytiäinen, Finland
Matti Järvinen, Finland
Jorma Kinnunen, Finland
Kimmo Kinnunen, Finland
Tapio Korjus, Finland
Ainārs Kovals, Latvia
Dainis Kūla, Soviet Union (Latvia)
Gergely Kulcsár, Hungary
Eric Lemming, Sweden
Jānis Lūsis, Soviet Union (Latvia)
Sergey Makarov, Russia
Jonni Myyrä, Finland
Miklós Németh, Hungary
Pauli Nevala, Finland
Yrjö Nikkanen, Finland
Eugene Oberst, United States
Aki Parviainen, Finland
Terje Pedersen, Norway
Urho Peltonen, Finland
Tom Petranoff, United States
Tero Pitkämäki, Finland
Seppo Räty, Finland
Tapio Rautavaara, Finland
Bob Roggy, United States
Antti Ruuskanen, Finland
Steve Seymour, United States
Janusz Sidło, Poland
Hannu Siitonen, Finland
Pentti Sinersaari, Finland
Andreas Thorkildsen, Norway
Braian Toledo, Argentina
Andrus Värnik, Estonia
Vadims Vasiļevskis, Latvia
Neeraj Chopra, India
Keshorn Walcott, Trinidad and Tobago
John Whittemore, United States, world's oldest athlete
Cy Young, United States
Jan Železný, Czech Republic
Arshad Nadeem, Pakistan

Women
Sonia Bisset, Cuba
Lillian Copeland, United States
Babe Didrikson, United States
Dorothy Dodson, United States
Petra Felke, GDR
Leryn Franco, Paraguay
Ruth Fuchs, GDR
Trine Hattestad, Norway
Kirsten Hellier, New Zealand
Tiina Lillak, Finland
Mirela Manjani, Greece
Osleidys Menéndez, Cuba
Steffi Nerius, Germany
Christina Obergföll, Germany
Heli Rantanen, Finland
Sofia Sakorafa, Greece
Tessa Sanderson, Great Britain
Kate Schmidt, United States
Natalya Shikolenko, Belarus
Barbora Špotáková, Czech Republic
Linda Stahl, Germany
Sunette Viljoen,  South Africa
Fatima Whitbread, Great Britain
Dana Zátopková, Czechoslovakia

See also

List of hammer throwers
List of middle-distance runners

Javelin throwers